O Diário was a Portuguese communist newspaper, that existed between 1976 and 1990.

References

1976 establishments in Portugal
1990 disestablishments in Portugal
Communist newspapers
Defunct newspapers published in Portugal
Publications established in 1976
Publications disestablished in 1990
Portuguese-language newspapers